Neochlamydia hartmannellae is a species of bacteria, the type species of its genus. It is a bacterial endocytobionts of Hartmannella vermiformis, hence its name.

References

Further reading
Whitman, William B., et al., eds. Bergey's manual® of systematic bacteriology. Vol. 5. Springer, 2012.
Schmid, E. N., K-D. Muller, and R. Michel. "Evidence for bacteriophages within Neochlamydia hartmannellae, an obligate endoparasitic bacterium of the free-living amoeba Hartmannella vermiformis." ENDOCYTOBIOSIS AND CELL RESEARCH 14.1/2 (2001): 115–120.

External links

LPSN

Chlamydiota
Bacteria described in 2001
Endoparasites